Max Liebman (August 2, 1902 – July 21, 1981) was a Broadway theater and TV producer-director sometimes called the "Ziegfeld of TV", who helped establish early television's comedy vocabulary with Your Show of Shows. He additionally helped bring improvisational comedy into the mainstream with his 1961 Broadway revue From the Second City.

Biography
Max Liebman was born in Vienna, Austria, and emigrated to the United States during childhood. He attended Boys High School in Brooklyn, New York City. where his extracurricular activities included the debating society and school theater, including shows with classmate Arthur Schwartz, the future Broadway composer. In 1920, Liebman entered vaudeville as a comedy sketch-writer, and in 1924 or 1925 became social director at Camp Log Cabin or the Log Tavern in Pennsylvania. In 1932 or 1933 he was named theater director at Tamiment, a Pocono Mountains resort, where he would remain for 15 years.

Concurrently, he made his Broadway debut as a sketch writer, alongside others including The Little King comic-strip cartoonist Otto Soglow, of the musical revue The Illustrators' Show. It ran five performances, from January 22–25, 1936, at the 48th Street Theatre. Undaunted by the short run, he went on to co-write, with Allen Boretz, the comedy play Off to Buffalo, featuring Hume Cronyn. This ran seven performances beginning February 21, 1939, at the Ethel Barrymore Theatre.

Back at the Tamiment Playhouse, Liebman recalled, "I was doing all the writing myself" until 1938, when he began working with Sylvia Fine. Fine introduced Liebman to her future husband, comedian Danny Kaye, whose talent Liebman immediately realized. He placed Kaye and comedian Imogene Coca in a Tamiment musical, The Straw Hat Revue, which moved to Broadway's Ambassador Theatre on September 29, 1939, where it ran 75 performances through December 2. Liebman wrote the musical's book and is credited directorially under  "staging". The cast included Coca, Kaye and Jerome Robbins. In 1948, he directed the sketches for the revue, Make Mine Manhattan, starring Sid Caesar in his Broadway debut and later the star of Liebman's, "Your Show of Shows."  Liebman also introduced to Broadway such Poconos performers as Betty Garrett and Jules Munshin, and the choreographer Lee Sherman, with whom he worked on "Make Mine Manhattan."

References

External links 
Max Liebman papers, 1903–1981, held by the Billy Rose Theatre Division, New York Public Library for the Performing Arts

1902 births
1981 deaths
Television producers from New York City
Austro-Hungarian emigrants to the United States
Boys High School (Brooklyn) alumni